The Health and Social Care Board is an organisation responsible for the commissioning of health services for the people of Northern Ireland. Its current chief executive is Ms. Valerie Watts.

Creation

The Health and Social Care (Reform) Act (Northern Ireland) 2009 followed the Review of Public Administration in 2007 and led to a reorganisation of health and social care delivery in Northern Ireland. Prior to enactment of this legislation, healthcare delivery in Northern Ireland was provided by 4 health boards, 11 community and social services trusts and 7 hospital trusts. This Act established the Health and Social Care Board and five Health and Social Care Trusts which are responsible for the delivery of primary, secondary and community health care.

Responsibilities

The responsibilities of the Health and Social Care board is to work in partnership with Northern Ireland's Public Health Agency to commission services, allocate resources and improve services for all people of Northern Ireland. Its commissioning is supported by five local commissioning groups that are geographically linked to five health and social care trusts. The Board is also directly responsible for community health care provided by general practitioners, dentists, opticians and community pharmacists. It reports directly to the  Department of Health and the current minister responsible is Robin Swann MLA.

Transforming Your Care

Transforming Your Care was a review of health and social care commissioned in 2011 by then Health Minister Edwin Poots and published in December 2011. The Health and Social Care Board are responsible for 72 of 99 recommendations made in the report.

Potential Abolition

In March 2016, then health minister Simon Hamilton announced that the Health and Social Care Board would be abolished and that commissioning responsibilities would be transferred directly to the Department of Health. His decision was met with criticism from both politicians and health professionals. Currently, the Board is still in position and no further plans for its future have been made.

References

External links 

 Health and Social Care Board

Health and Social Care (Northern Ireland)